The women's tournament at the 2019 World Team Ninepin Bowling Classic Championships were held in Rokycany, Czech Republic, from 18 to 26 May 2019.

Croatia captured their second title by defeating Hungary 5–3 in the final match. Bronze was secured by Germany who beat host Czechia 7–1.

Participating teams

Draw

Groups

Group stage

Group A 

|}

Group B 

|}

Group C 

|}

Group D 

|}

Final Round

Bracket

Quarterfinals

Semifinals

Third place game

Final

Final standing

Footnotes

References 

World Team Ninepin Bowling Classic Championships - Women's tournaments
2019 World Team Ninepin Bowling Classic Championships